Ploho (Russian for "bad") is a Russian post-punk band from Novosibirsk, formed in 2013.

History
The group was established in Novosibirsk in 2013. In an interview with Post-Punk.com the band cited growing up in the "rather cold and dark time" of "total crime and chaos" of Russia in the 1990s as drawing the band members towards punk music from an early age. Most influential to the band in this period was the seminal Soviet 80s post punk band Kino. 

In 2018, the American radio station XRAY.fm listed the band's album Kuda ptitsy uletayut umirat in their ranking of the top 25 best albums of the year.

In June 2020, the band signed with Canadian record label Artoffact Records. In February 2021, the band released Fantomniye chuvstva, their first album under the label. The album was recorded while the musicians were quarantining during the COVID-19 pandemic.

Studio albums

Cameo role in Isaac
The group made a cameo in the film Isaac from the Lithuanian director Jurgis Matulevičius. They cameo as a band during a scene and play their songs "Crosses" and "Down".

See also
 Buerak
Molchat Doma

References

External links
 

 Группа Ploho выпустила новый альбом «Культура Доминирования». Eatmusic.ru.
 Плохо когда Ploho. Muzstorona.

Musical groups from Novosibirsk
Russian post-punk music groups
Musical groups established in 2013
2013 establishments in Russia
Russian rock music groups